Acland is an English surname. The Aclands of Devon (often Dyke Acland: see Acland baronets, Dyke Acland baronets) were an influential family, whose name was derived from Acland near Barnstaple. Notable people with the surname include:

 Alexander Fuller-Acland-Hood, 1st Baron St Audries (1853–1917), British Conservative Party politician
 Alexander Acland Hood (disambiguation), multiple people
 Alfred Dyke Acland (1858–1937), lieutenant colonel in the Royal 1st Devon Yeomanry (territorial army), son of Sir Henry Wentworth Acland
 Sir Antony Acland (1930–2021), Head of the Diplomatic Service and Provost of Eton
 Arthur Floyer-Acland (1885–1980), British soldier
 Charles R. Acland (born 1963), Canadian professor and author
 Chris Acland (1966–1996), 1990s Britpop musician
Emily Acland (1830–1905), pioneer settler in New Zealand and a watercolour artist
 Sir Francis Dyke Acland, 14th Baronet (1874–1939), British Liberal politician
 Gilbert Acland-Troyte (1876–1964), British soldier and Conservative Party politician
 Guy Acland (born 1946), British Army officer and member of the British Royal Household
 Lady Harriet Acland (1750–1815), wife of John Dyke Acland
 Henry Acland (1815–1900), physician and son of Sir Thomas Acland
 Hugh Acland (disambiguation), multiple people
 Jack Acland (1904–1981), New Zealand politician of the National Party
 John Acland (disambiguation), multiple people
 John Edward Troyte (1848–1932), or Acland-Troyte, born Acland, founder of the Oxford University Society of Change Ringers
 John Acland (British Army officer) (1928–2006), British Army officer
 Peter Acland (1902–1993), son of Alfred Dyke Acland
 Reginald Acland (1856–1924), British barrister and judge
 Sir Richard Acland (1906–1990), 15th Baronet, Member of Parliament and one of the founders of UK's Common Wealth Party
 Richard Acland (bishop) (1881–1954), British soldier and Anglican bishop
 Robert D. Acland (1941–2016), son of Sir Richard Acland, and plastic surgeon and microsurgery pioneer
 Sarah Acland (1815–1878), wife of Sir Henry Acland
 Sarah Angelina Acland (1849–1930), daughter of Sir Henry Acland and Sarah Acland, and pioneer of colour photography
 Simon Acland (born 1958), son of Sir Antony Acland, British venture capitalist and author
 Stafford Floyer-Acland (1916–1994), British soldier
 Thomas Acland (disambiguation), multiple people

Places
 Acland, Queensland, a town in the Toowoomba Region, Australia
 Acland Hospital, Oxford, England

English toponymic surnames